Natalie Seymour (born 29 September 1986) is a British triathlete and former field hockey player. She competed for England in the women's hockey tournament at the 2010 Commonwealth Games where she won a bronze medal.

Seymour was a reserve team member in the hockey tournament at the 2012 Summer Olympics. However, she was not chosen to play in any of the matches and so did not get to share in an eventual bronze medal with the rest of her teammates. Following on from this disappointment she decided to take an 18-month hiatus from the sport, and in 2014 she switched to competing in the triathlon.

References

External links 
 

1986 births
Living people
Commonwealth Games bronze medallists for England
English female field hockey players
Field hockey players at the 2010 Commonwealth Games
Commonwealth Games medallists in field hockey
Medallists at the 2010 Commonwealth Games